Mykhailo Medvid (Mikhail Medved; born 30 January 1964) is a retired male decathlete who first represented the Soviet Union during his career and later Ukraine. He set his personal best score (8330 points) on July 31, 1988 at a meet in Kyiv.

Achievements

References
 Profile
 1991 Year List
 

1964 births
Living people
Soviet decathletes
Ukrainian decathletes
Universiade medalists in athletics (track and field)
Goodwill Games medalists in athletics
Universiade silver medalists for the Soviet Union
Medalists at the 1989 Summer Universiade
Competitors at the 1990 Goodwill Games